Chris Whitehead (born 9 May 1986) is a rugby union player for Exeter Chiefs in the Aviva Premiership. His position of choice is Hooker.

His Premiership debut for Chiefs came against Leicester Tigers at Sandy Park in 2010 which followed his club debut against Bourgoin coming off the bench. Whitehead joined Exeter from London Wasps whom Whitehead joined in 2009 from Coventry RFC, However while at Wasps Whitehead had spent much of his time on loan with London Welsh Whitehead is also came through the Leicester Tigers Academy

Unfortunately, in March 2014 Whitehead had to retire due to a degenerative neck injury. After consulting with specialists, he was advised to retire. Fittingly, his last game for the Chiefs was the LV Cup final. He played a vital role in the Exeter Chiefs' victory by scoring multiple tries.

Currently Chris is Senior Coach at Kingsbridge Rugby Football Club in Devon, who play in Tribute Western Counties West league.

References

External links
 Exeter Player Profile
 Premiership Rugby Player Profile
 
 Kingsbridge Rugby Football Club

Living people
1986 births
Exeter Chiefs players
Rugby union players from Derby